Midway University is a private Christian university in Midway, Kentucky. Related by covenant to the Christian Church (Disciples of Christ), it enrolls approximately 1,900 students earning two-year and four-year degrees as well as master's degrees. Midway was the only women's college in Kentucky until 2016 when it began admitting male undergraduate students.

History
Midway University originally opened as the Kentucky Female Orphan School on October 3, 1849, with one teacher and sixteen female students. The nine members of the Board of Trustees oversaw the school's endowment, the building and five acres of land.

The co-founders of the school were Dr. L.L. (Lewis Letig) Pinkerton (1812–1875), minister of the Midway Christian Church (Disciples of Christ) from 1844 to 1860, and Mr. James Ware Parrish, a Midway Christian Church elder. They obtained a charter on February 17, 1847, from the Kentucky legislature through the help of Kentucky Senator Major George W. Williams. Before the school was permitted to open, an endowment of twenty-five thousand dollars had to be secured and investments made. This time was used for soliciting funds, purchasing land, construction of a building, and drafting and outline of government and management for the school.

John Dawson was Superintendent and his wife, Mary, was Matron when the Kentucky Female Orphan School opened in 1849. Associate principal and assistant matron, Eliza Davies, wrote that in those early days the "house was not furnished; the girls slept on straw mattresses; the floors were uncarpeted."

The Kentucky Female Orphan School girls' education was directed by four main points:
 The development and corroboration of the moral constitution.
 The improvement of the intellectual powers.
 The development of the physical powers.
 Such direction of all the capabilities and attainments of the pupils, as will afford them the best prospect of a livelihood, in the useful and honorable employment of their requirements.

The early years of operation had four grades. They were compared to an intensive high school education which included all courses: Ray's Higher Arithmetic, two years of Algebra, plane geometry, trigonometry, physics, botany, physiology, psychology, astronomy, physical geography, chemistry, geology, mineralogy, zoology, grammar, spelling, diacritical marks, rhetoric, American and English Literature, classics, U.S. History, English History, ancient, medieval, and modern history, Latin, and instrumental and vocal music. Sixteen credits were required to graduate, but according to the school president Miss Lucy Peterson many students graduated with twenty-five credits.

The school served, at various times, as an elementary and high school, and eventually became a junior college and, then a fully accredited baccalaureate-granting institution as Midway College. As a career training provider, the Kentucky Female Orphan School identified the needs of the community, the resources in the area and the demand for higher education.  The intention was to empower disadvantaged women with an education in the field of teaching. 

In 2010, the school announced the launching of the Midway College School of Pharmacy in Paintsville, Kentucky. The plan was abandoned the next year due to higher than expected startup costs and failure to secure accreditation.

On July 1, 2015, the college changed its name to Midway University. In the Fall semester of 2016, Midway University admitted men to its day program for the first time.

Campus

The school is located on a  working farm in the heart of the Kentucky Bluegrass region. The campus overlooks Midway, a small town in central Kentucky. The National Park Service placed Pinkerton Hall, the oldest building on campus, on the National Register of Historic Places on November 20, 1974.

Academic buildings
 Equine Education Center houses a  x  indoor riding arena, eight stalls, laboratory, classroom, a large tack room, audio-visual room, wash stall and faculty offices.
 Keeneland Barn contains equipment for horse rehabilitation, a tack room, wash room, office space, and 16 stalls for horses.
 Ashland Equine Barn contains 8 stalls, office space, and a washroom.
 Marrs Hall, with a clock tower, houses the Arthur Young Lloyd Board Room, and the Office of the President, Office of Advancement and Alumni Relations on the first floor. In 2020, the building had a major renovation and now houses the University's Welcome Center on the top floor which includes the Admissions Office, Business Office, and Financial Aid, making this a one stop location for prospective students and their families. The lower-level houses the Accounting, Human Resources and Marketing offices.
 The Starks Center (on the original footprint of Starks Hall) was built in 2010, and serves as the main classroom building on campus. The building also contains the offices of the Vice President of Academic Affairs, the Dean of Arts & Science, the Dean of Business, Equine and Sport Studies  and the Registrar. The Teacher Education division is housed on the second floor, along with classrooms and faculty offices. The basement houses the Equine Division's administrative offices, along with additional classrooms and faculty office space.
 Anne Hart Raymond Center for Mathematics, Science & Technology opened in the fall 2003 semester. A  building with laboratories for biology, anatomy, microbiology/immunology, botany, physics, chemistry and physical/environmental science. Faculty members and upper-level students have access to dedicated laboratory space to pursue more advanced research projects. Additionally, the building has a 450-seat auditorium, classrooms, and faculty offices.
 The Hunter Field House (opened June 2020) 20,000 square foot athletic building includes an auxiliary gymnasium, a weight and cardio room, an elevated walking track, two locker rooms, an athlete study room, coaches’ offices and meeting space. The Hunter Field House is used mostly for athletic practices and some special events. The Hunter Field House was made possible by the generous donation of Midway University Trustee Janet Green Hunter and her husband, Richard.

Residential buildings
 Buster Hall offers traditional-style rooms with pod-style bathrooms on each floor and new laundry facility on the main floor (renovated in 2021) . This is the largest residence hall. (2).
 Belle Wisdom Hall students live in suite-style rooms, sharing private bathrooms with 2–4 residents. Belle is the oldest dorm on the campus. 
 Pinkerton Hall was the first building on campus and housed all the functions of the Kentucky Female Orphan School before being converted to offices. The building was renovated in Summer 2019 to return it to housing.

Athletics
The Midway athletic teams are called the Eagles. The college is a member of the National Association of Intercollegiate Athletics (NAIA), primarily competing in the River States Conference (RSC; formerly known as the Kentucky Intercollegiate Athletic Conference (KIAC) until after the 2015–16 school year) for most of its sports since the 1991–92 academic year; while its men's & women's bowling, men's & women's swimming, men's volleyball and men's wrestling teams compete in the Mid-South Conference (MSC). Formerly a women's institution, men's sports were added into the Eagles' athletic program since the 2016–17 academic year.

Midway competes in 28 intercollegiate varsity sports: Men's sports include baseball, basketball, bowling, cross country, golf, soccer, sprint football, swimming, tennis, track & field, volleyball and wrestling; while women's sports include basketball, bowling, cross country, golf, soccer, softball, swimming, tennis, track & field and volleyball. and co-ed sports include archery, cheer, dance, eSports, and equestrian (hunt seat, western and Dressage).

Sprint football
The next sport to be added is sprint football, a weight-restricted form of American football not governed by the NAIA or the National Collegiate Athletic Association (NCAA). Midway will start play in 2022 as one of six charter members of the Midwest Sprint Football League.

Notable faculty
 Sally Haydon
 Bob Heleringer

References

External links
 Official website
 Official athletics website

Educational institutions established in 1847
Universities and colleges affiliated with the Christian Church (Disciples of Christ)
Former women's universities and colleges in the United States
Universities and colleges accredited by the Southern Association of Colleges and Schools
Education in Woodford County, Kentucky
Buildings and structures in Woodford County, Kentucky
Education in Johnson County, Kentucky
History of women in Kentucky
River States Conference
1847 establishments in Kentucky
Private universities and colleges in Kentucky